The Ford Super Duty (short for F-Series Super Duty) is a series of heavy-duty pickup trucks produced by the Ford Motor Company since the 1999 model year.  Slotted above the consumer-oriented Ford F-150, the Super Duty trucks are an expansion of the Ford F-Series range, from the F-250 to the F-550.  Rather than adapting lighter-duty trucks for heavier use, Super Duty trucks have been designed as a dedicated variant of the Ford F-Series, including pickup trucks and chassis-cab vehicles; the Ford F-450 is the largest pickup truck offered for sale in North America.

Currently in their fourth generation, Super Duty trucks use a separate chassis from the F-150, including heavier-duty frame and chassis components, which allows for heavier payloads and towing capabilities. The model line also offers Ford PowerStroke V8 diesel engines as an option.

Alongside pickup trucks and chassis cabs, the Super Duty line includes medium-duty F-Series trucks (F-650 and F-750); the Super Duty pickup truck also served as the basis for the Ford Excursion full-sized SUV.

Ford F-250 to F-550 Super Duty trucks are assembled at the Kentucky Truck Plant in Louisville, Kentucky, while medium-duty F-650 and F-750s are assembled at Ohio Assembly in Avon Lake, Ohio. Prior to 2016, medium-duty trucks were assembled in Mexico under the Blue Diamond Truck joint venture with Navistar International.

Background

Previous use of name 
In 1958, Ford introduced the Super Duty engine family as large-block V8 engines for trucks, offered in 401, 477, and 534 cubic-inch displacements.  The largest-block V8 engines ever built by Ford Motor Company, the Super Duty engines were the largest mass-produced gasoline V8 engines in the world (for road-going vehicles).

To showcase the engine launch, the "Big Job" conventional truck variants of the F-Series were rebranded as Super Duty, a name added to other Ford trucks as well.  Alongside the Ford C-Series and H-Series cabovers, the N-Series conventional adopted the Super Duty name.  Though its poor fuel economy proved uncompetitive against the increasing popularity of diesel engines, the durability of the Super Duty V8 kept the engine in production until 1981.

In 1987, Ford revitalized the name as a Class 4 truck badged as "F-Super Duty".  Manufactured solely as a chassis cab vehicle, these trucks were the heaviest F-Series trucks at the time, offered only with the 7.5L gasoline V8 or the 7.3L diesel V8.

F-Series change 
In response to the changing demographics of pickup truck purchases during the 1980s and 1990s, as part of the redesign of the F-Series for the 1997 model year, the model family began a split into two model families, introducing the 1997 Ford F-150 as the first of two distinct F-Series lines.  While still functioning as a full-size pickup, the F-150 adopted carlike aerodynamics and convenience features to expand its appeal among consumers.  To appeal towards commercial and fleet buyers and owners who tow, the F-250 and F-350s were developed as a separate, dedicated heavy-duty truck platform (in place of using one chassis for all of its trucks).   By expanding the model line into two separate but related platforms, the inevitable compromises inherent in offering a wide range of load-carrying capacities were avoided.

Prior to the release of the Ford Super Duty series, the previous-generation F-250HD and F-350 returned for sale for 1997 and 1998 (alongside a separate 1997/1998 F-250 light duty based upon the F-150).

First generation (1999–2007)

Beginning production in early 1998 for the 1999 model (the 1998 model year was skipped), the Ford F-Series Super Duty consisted of the F-250 pickup truck, F-350 pickup truck and chassis cab, and introduced the F-450 and F-550 chassis cab trucks (see below). The Super Duty trucks were produced with three cab configurations - a two-door standard cab, 2+2 door SuperCab, and four-door crew cab. The SuperCab configuration of the Super Duty marked the introduction of two standard rear-hinged doors on the extended cab, a feature also adopted by the F-150 and Ranger/Mazda B-Series for 1999. The standard-cab pickup was produced with an 8-foot bed; SuperCab and crew cabs were produced with a 6 3/4-foot bed, with an 8-foot bed optional.  Chassis cab models came with more and different bed length and wheelbase options, but with the same cabs.  Two-wheel drive was standard, with four-wheel drive as an option; on F-350 pickup trucks, a dual rear-wheel axle was optional with either drive configuration.

Styled by Andrew Jacobson (designer of the 1997 Ford F-150) and Moray Callum, aside from taillamp lenses and the tailgate, the Super Duty shared no visible parts with the Ford F-150, even the interior itself. Under the skin, only the base-equipment 5.4-liter V8 and 4R100 transmission are shared. While sharing the similar aerodynamic cab design of its smaller counterpart, the exteriors of the Super Duty trucks are much different forward of the windshield. While an influence often compared to the 1994–2002 Dodge Ram, the Super Duty also derives elements of styling from much larger Ford trucks, including the Ford LTL-9000 and Aeromax, with a raised hood line, large grille, and low fenders. A feature drawn from 1996 redesign of the Louisville/Aeromax was in the design of the side window openings; the front portion is lowered, allowing for increased side visibility (as well as larger side-view mirrors).  To improve aerodynamics over metal-framed mirrors, manual-telescoping trailer-tow mirrors were available as an option. As an industry first, two large, complete, ring-style front tow hooks were included. A minor update occurred in the 2002 model year, which received a new instrument cluster with a digital odometer.

2005 update 

For the 2005 model year, the Ford Super Duty trucks were given exterior and interior updates. For the exterior, a new grille, front bumper, and headlights were introduced alongside the introduction of a locking tailgate for all pickup trucks. Under the skin (with thicker frame rails), updated Triton gasoline engines were introduced with higher engine output and larger alternators; in response to the increased power, all trucks were given four-wheel disc brakes (with two-piston calipers). To accommodate the larger brakes, 17-inch wheels became standard, with 18-inch wheels optional (on single rear-wheel trucks); forged Alcoa wheels were an option. The long-running Twin I-Beam front suspension continued on two-wheel drive trucks.

To the interior, several changes were made to improve functionality for end users. Along with the addition of a driver-side glove compartment, the truck added the option of dashboard-mounted auxiliary switches (for owners who fit equipment such as snowplows, winches, and auxiliary lights); these are switches that were typically user designed. For users who tow, a new option was Ford TowCommand, a trailer brake controller built into the dashboard, allowing it to integrate with the ABS system and engine computer from the factory.

Mechanical details 
During its production, the first-generation Ford F-Series Super Duty was sold with two gasoline and two diesel engine options.

Gasoline engines 
Replacing the overhead-valve engines used in previous F-Series models, for the Super Duty, Ford transitioned to the Triton overhead-cam engine family (truck versions of the Ford Modular engines).

At its launch, the standard engine in the Super Duty was a Triton V8.

As a replacement for the long-running 7.5 L/460 V8, for the Super Duty, Ford introduced a Triton V10.

Both the V8 and V10 Triton engines are designed with a fail-safe cooling system to protect the engine in case of major coolant loss. If the engine overheats, the engine will continue to operate on half of its cylinders. Alternating back and forth between each set of four (or five) pistons, the set that is not receiving fuel and ignition is operating to pump air through the engine to lower its temperature. Although engine output is limited, dependent on upon vehicle load, outside temperature, and current road conditions, the system is designed to allow the vehicle to travel a short distance to receive service or to reach a repair facility.

Diesel engines 
Available in both F-250 and F-350 pickup trucks, as well as F-450 and F-550 chassis cabs, the F-Series was sold with optional PowerStroke V8 diesel engines produced under its joint venture with Navistar International.

At its launch, the F-Series Super Duty was sold with the 7.3 L Power Stroke V8. Initially producing 235 hp/500 lb-ft of torque, the engine was retuned in 2001. Versions equipped with an automatic transmission produced 250 hp, while manual-transmission examples produced 275 hp; with either transmission, the engine produced 525 lb-ft of torque. As the 7.3 L V8 was no longer able to comply with noise regulations for diesel engines, it was discontinued midway through the 2003 model year.

As a running change during the 2003 model year, the 6.0 L Power Stroke V8 was introduced as the replacement for the previous 7.3 L V8 in LHD markets supplied with the American-assembled trucks, while RHD ones supplied from Brazil kept the 7.3 L until 2005. As before, the engine continued to be produced by Navistar. A 32-valve pushrod engine, the 6.0 L V8 featured a single variable-vane turbocharger. Due to problems with the head bolts Navistar re-designed the engine with reinforced heads, more torque and power, releasing the new design in 2005–2006. As with its predecessor, the 6.0 L ended its production run due to tighter emissions requirements, replaced as part of the Super Duty redesign for the 2008 model year.

The 6.0 L Power Stroke was the target of a class-action lawsuit, alleging the engines were defective. Ford settled the lawsuit with owners and former owners of 6.0 L diesel-equipped Super Duty trucks and E-Series vans in 2013, by reimbursing them for the cost of repairs to the exhaust gas recirculation system, fuel injectors, and turbocharger, which were common failure points.

Transmissions
Four transmissions were available. Several configurations of the ZF5 five-speed manual transmission were offered: small block pattern, big block pattern, and diesel. Close-ratio and wide-ratio gearings were available, as well as 4WD and 2WD configurations with the exception of integrated driveshaft brake 2WD versions using the 4x4 style transmission. Earlier s5-42 versions were rated to 570 Nm (420 ft-lb) of torque, while later s5-47 versions were rated to 636 Nm (470 ft-lb). ZF six-speed manual for diesel engines. An optional 4R100 four-speed automatic was available for either the gasoline or diesel engines, later being replaced with the TorqShift five-speed automatic. The five-speed automatics are rated at exactly (1000 ft-lb), enabling higher towing capacity than trucks with the standard five- or six-speed manual transmission. The six-speed manual transmission used an integrated PTO.

Torqshift 5R110
The Torqshift five-speed 5R110 automatic transmission replaced the four-speed in the 2003 model year diesel trucks to compete with the Allison 1000 series from General Motors; it was paired with the new 6.0 L diesel engine. The TorqShift design, in fact, has six forward ratios, but only five are advertised, with the 'hidden' gear only used in extreme cold weather. The TorqShift first to fifth gear ratios are 3.11, 2.22, 1.55, 1.00, and 0.71:1. It also uses an alternate fourth gear, overdrive on second gear of the three-speed automatic component (0.72 × 1.55), that is 1.10:1 that is used under cold start conditions to aid engine and transmission warm up. On the TorqShift; once the Tow/Haul mode is activated, it can help increase a driver's control when towing large loads up and down steep grades and automatically minimizes shifts and maximizes available torque. Upon descent, the Tow/Haul mode uses engine braking to help extend brake life and improve driver control. An adaptive shift function monitors the TorqShift's performance over its lifetime and adjusts shift pressures in real time to assure consistent shift feel and compensate for wear. For ease of maintenance, the TorqShift's oil filter is an easily serviced, cartridge design that was usually mounted on the passenger side behind the front bumper. Also, the TorqShift's larger fluid lines and a larger transmission oil cooler help to assure cooler operating temperatures, even under the most demanding conditions. This was Ford's first automatic transmission to feature a power take-off (PTO). The transmission can be equipped with an integrated PTO provision (which automatically locks the torque converter providing power to the PTO gear when the operator turns on the PTO switch).

Transfer case and 4x4
On 4WD models, a choice was available of either a manual, chain-driven transfer case floor shifter with manual front locking hubs or electronic shift-on-the-fly (a $185 option over the manual) dash knob with vacuum-activated automatic, and (in case of failure) manual override front hubs. The optional FX4 models are basically a standard 4WD with an Off-Road package that includes upgraded heavy-duty Rancho shocks, added skid plates for the fuel tank and transfer case, and two "FX4" decals on both back bed sides instead of the standard "4x4". For all 4WD models, the two-speed transfer case 4x4-LOW range has a gear reduction of 2.72:1. Brazilian and Venezuelan versions had only the ESOF transfer case.

Suspension

For the first-generation Super Duty range, Ford used several different suspension configurations, depending on the model of truck. All pickup models have heavy-duty  leaf springs and staggered shock absorbers. A standard stabilizer bar is included on dual rear-wheel models and an option on single rear-wheel versions. An optional slide-in camper certification package with heavier-duty springs was available on single rear-wheel models. All versions of the Super Duty trucks came equipped with four-wheel disc brakes.

On 2WD F-250 and F-350 pickups, the Twin I-Beam independent front suspension with coil springs was used; their 4WD counterparts were equipped with solid front axle (Dana 50 and Dana 60) with leaf springs. In 2005, the front suspension was updated as 4WD trucks were converted to front coil springs; to reduce unsprung weight, the mounting of the front sway bar was changed to the frame instead of the front axle. The manual locking hubs on Super Duty trucks are made by Warn.

The F-250 and F-350 single-rear wheel versions were fitted with a  Sterling 10.5 axle 35-spline axle with choices of conventional or limited-slip differentials; initially developed for previous-generation Ford trucks, it was strengthened for use in the Super Duty. In dual-rear wheel F-350s, the rear axle was a Dana 80.

On F-450 and F-550 chassis cab trucks, the Dana 60 front axle was replaced with a Dana Super 60 in 2005; 2008-2010 and 2015-2018 F-450 pickups used Dana S 110 rear axles, while 2011-2014 F-450 pickups used Dana 80 axles. All F-450 chassis cabs used a Dana S 110, while F-550s used a Dana 135 from 1999 to 2004 and an S 110 from 2005 on.

F-250 solid axle
The Dana 50 axle featured on most F-250 Super Duty trucks differs greatly from the early models. The Dana 50 started out as a Twin Traction Beam axle (much like independent suspension) in 1980 and lasted to 1997 models. The Super Duty models then used a solid axle version of this axle. The ring, pinion, carrier, and U joints all remained the same, however. The Dana 50 was phased out of the trucks in 2004, in favor of the Dana 60, and was last used in the Ford Excursion.

Trim levels
Throughout its production run, the first-generation 1999-2007 Ford F-Series Super Duty was offered in three main trim levels:

The base XL was the "work truck" trim level. Its standard features included a manual transmission, an AM/FM stereo with two front door-mounted speakers, a heater and blower, vinyl-trimmed seating surfaces with bench seats, steel wheels with black center hubs, black front and rear bumpers, a black "egg-crate" front grille, and manual windows and door locks. Optional features that were offered on this trim level included cloth-trimmed seating surfaces or vinyl- and cloth-trimmed seating surfaces, power windows and door locks, an AM/FM stereo with cassette player (later, a single-disc CD player instead of a cassette player) and four speakers, chrome front and rear bumpers as part of an XL Decor Group, an automatic transmission, and air conditioning.

The midrange XLT was the most popular trim level. It added these features to the base XL trim level: an AM/FM stereo with cassette player (later, a single-disc CD player instead of a cassette player) and four speakers, cloth-trimmed seating surfaces, bright center wheel hubs, chrome front and rear bumpers, a chrome "egg-crate" front grille with black inserts, power windows and door locks, and air conditioning. Optional features that were offered on this trim level included aluminum wheels, keyless entry (later, this option became standard equipment on this trim level), an AM/FM stereo with both a cassette player and a single-disc CD player (later, a six-disc, in-dash CD changer), an automatic transmission, and a power-adjustable front driver's bench seat.

The top-of-the-line Lariat was the most luxurious trim level. It added these features to the mid-range XLT trim level: an AM/FM stereo with both a cassette player and a single-disc CD player (later, a six-disc, in-dash CD changer), leather-trimmed seating surfaces, chrome-clad (later aluminum) wheels and center wheel hubs, keyless entry, a security system, electronic climate controls, a power front bench seat with fold-down center armrest, wood interior trim panels, and a chrome front grille with chrome inserts. Available options included two-tone exterior paint, color-keyed grille insert as well as front & rear bumpers, bucket seats replacing the bench seat, heated front seats, and an automatic transmission (which later became standard on this trim level).

Special editions 
There were multiple special edition Super Duty models that were offered.

For 2003, a special Centennial Edition Super Duty Crew Cab was offered to celebrate the 100th anniversary of Ford Motor Company. The truck could be ordered only as a Crew Cab, but a choice of bed lengths, dual or single rear wheels and gasoline or diesel engines were available. The Centennial Edition offered as standard equipment: monochromatic black clearcoat exterior, premium Verona-grain Imola leather seating finished in two-tone parchment, Special Centennial Edition badging, and a commemorative keychain and wristwatch. The Centennial Edition also came with special leather-bound owner's manual with the embossed signatures of Henry Ford, Edsel Ford, Henry Ford II, and William Clay Ford Jr.

Ford offered a special Harley-Davidson Super Duty truck from 2004 to 2007. Available only on single rear wheel models, the Harley package could be had as either SuperCab or Crew Cab and customers could choose either V10 gas or 6.0 L PowerStroke turbodiesel power. Based upon the Lariat trim, Harleys had a unique black leather interior, with the Bar and Shield logo adorning the front and rear captain's chairs (SuperCab models had a rear bench). Heated seats, a leather-wrapped multifunction steering wheel, power-adjustable pedals, and power-adjustable heated mirrors round out the standard equipment. Unique spun-metal gauge faceplates embroidered carpeted floor mats, and a leather-wrapped console lid with individually serial numbered badging round out unique interior appointments. The 2004 Harleys could be had with three unique paint schemes, Competition Orange/Black Clearcoat two-tone, Dark Shadow Gray/Black Clearcoat two-tone, or a Black Clearcoat solid paint job. Unique pinstriping was found on all three of the color options.

In 2003, Ford began to offer its King Ranch trim package to the F-250 and F-350 Super Duty trucks. This included rich Castaño leather seats, steering wheel audio and climate controls, front heated seats, 18-inch aluminum wheels (single) or 17-inch wheels (dual), and an improved instrument panel.

Changes to the Harley package in 2005 corresponded to the refresh of the F-250 and F-350 Super Duty models. No longer could one order a SuperCab Harley-Davidson, and the 5.4 L V8 was added as the base engine for the package. New unique, black-trimmed headlights, billet-style grille, and 20-inch wheels were made standard. Gone were the two-tone paint jobs, but optional was painted ghost flames; 2005 models could be had in two color options, Black or True Blue Metallic. The interior stayed largely the same, with luxurious black leather captain's chairs in the front and rear and Harley Bar and Shield badging galore, but the truck got the same interior updates as other 2005 Super Duty truck.

F-450/F-550
To bridge the gap between the pickup line and the much larger medium-duty F-650/F-750, Ford introduced the F-450 and F-550 variants of the Super Duty; with an available GVWR from 17,950 to 19,500 lb, it pushes the Super Duty into the Class 5 truck market. Available only as a chassis cab, both versions were fitted with dual rear wheels.

While largely aimed at fleet buyers, F-450 and F-550 models were configurable in XL, XLT, and Lariat trim levels available to Super Duty pickup buyers. The sole gasoline engine was the 6.8 L V10, while the 7.3 L Power Stroke was the diesel option; in 2003, this was replaced by the 6.0 L Power Stroke.

In 2005, the F-450 and F-550 received further updates to the exterior than the rest of the Super Duty line, with an extended front bumper and front fenders; the F-550 received a "wide-track" front axle to sharpen its turning radius.

Worldwide 

The Ford F-350 Super Duty first generation was also assembled in Venezuela as a commercial small truck from 1999 to 2010. For this market, the F-350 was equipped with the 5.4 L V8 Triton engine, a five-speed manual transmission, and a choice of 4WD or 2WD.

Ford Super Duty trucks were built in Brazil, with different engines from their North American counterparts and fewer options, initially between 1999 and 2011, with a limited reintroduction of the F-350 in 2014. The dual-rear wheel variant of the F-350 is known locally as F-4000. They were widely exported to Australia (F-250 and F-350), South Africa (F-250), and Argentina (F-250, rebadged as F-100, and the F-350 DRW rebadged as F-4000), usually following the Brazilian specification (with an obvious change of the cockpit location in the versions targeted to Australia, South Africa, and other RHD markets), but Australia had a wider range of options in pair with its American counterparts, including automatic transmission and the V8 engines. The SuperCab was never officially available in Brazil and regional export markets (Uruguay and Argentina), but was made in RHD for export to Australia. South Africa had only the MWM engine and five-speed manual transmission, with the option of 2WD and 4WD for the single cab, while the crew cab had 4WD as standard.

Second generation (2008–2010) 

The second-generation Super Duty was supposed to debut for model year 2007, but quality issues pushed it back to the 2008 model year. It features an all-new  PowerStroke diesel V8 with piezo fuel injectors and sequential turbos to replace the 6.0 L PowerStroke single-turbo diesel V8. The vehicle had its first official showing at the Texas State Fair in 2006. Ford started taking orders in January 2007. The first 2008 F-450 pickup sold to the public, was delivered to Randy Whipple of Muskegon, Michigan, in February 2007.

Located near the same dash area as the last generation (but slightly to the right and more directly below the radio), this generation of Super Duty models has the same Ford TowCommand trailer brake controller and four AUX Upfitter switches as the last generation set-up.

An optional concealed slide-out step and swing-up hand grab bar were added to the rear tailgate for easy access.

Ford introduced its all new optional "Rapid-Heat Supplemental Cab Heater", only available on Super Duty trucks with the diesel engine and TorqShift automatic transmission. In the winter, it quickly raises the cabin temperature to a comfortable level until the engine is warm enough to handle the job.

The interior of the Super Duty was completely redesigned, with a new instrument cluster (with an enhanced message center) with similar styling to that of the 11th generation F-150 (2004-2008), as well as new steering wheel, center dash bezel, interior door panels, and seat trim. Sirius Satellite Radio, a 3.5 mm auxiliary audio input jack (for all models equipped with a CD player or CD changer), a new "premium" audio system with an external amplifier and subwoofer, and a GPS navigation system radio with a touchscreen display were all new features. In 2009, the Ford SYNC entertainment system became available on select trim levels, adding Bluetooth hands-free calling and wireless stereo audio streaming via A2DP and a USB port for the first time on the Super Duty.

Trim
This second generation of Super Duty trucks includes the F-250 (starting at $22,380), F-350 (starting at $24,025), and the all-new F-450 (starting at $39,205). The F-250 and F-350 basically had the same payload and towing specifications as the last generation.

The model lineup for the 2010 F-250 and F-350 consisted of the XL (starting at $25,300), XLT (starting at $28,845), Lariat (starting at $36,420), Cabela's (starting at $42,655), King Ranch (starting at $42,955), and Harley-Davidson (starting at $56,925).

The model lineup for the F-450 consisted of the XL (starting at $44,145), XLT (starting at $49,525), Lariat (starting at $52,965), King Ranch (starting at $56,955), and the Harley-Davidson (starting at $62,625).

The FX4 model, which was once just an optional off-road 4x4 package that could be added to any model in the lineup, is replaced by the 4x4 Off Road Package. The FX4 became a model of its own. It still had the same specs as the previous generation but with more of a sporty trim package. The FX4 model has been discontinued for the 2010 model year and has been reverted to an optional Off Road 4X4 package.

XL - Included: Vinyl upholstery, 5.4L Triton V8, 17" steel wheels with all-season tires, rear folding bench seat (XL Crew Cab), an AM/FM stereo with digital clock and 2 speakers, black vinyl floor covering, visors, sealed-beam halogen lamps, manual windows, manual locks, and manual side-view mirrors.
XLT - Added: 18" steel wheels, cloth upholstery, lumbar support, power locks, power mirrors, power windows with automatic driver's side window, air conditioning, an AM/FM stereo with a single-CD player with MP3 capability, an auxiliary input jack, a digital clock and four speakers, cruise control, color coordinated carpet floor covering, tilt steering wheel, and dual-beam headlamps.
FX4 (2008-2009) - Added: 17" forged aluminum wheels with all-terrain tires, automatic headlamps, illuminated entry, keyless entry with driver door keypad, securi-lock anti-theft ignition, a security alarm, FX4 cloth upholstery, black all-weather floor mats, metallic faced cluster with chrome faced gauges, overhead console with sunglasses storage, and a black-leather wrapped steering wheel.
Lariat - Added: Power driver and passenger seats, leather upholstery, automatic air conditioning, enhanced message center with distance to empty and compass, color-coordinated leather wrapped steering wheel with audio controls, visors with illuminated mirrors, and woodgrain style accents for the dash, and later, Ford SYNC.

Special Editions 
For 2008, Ford and Harley-Davidson once again joined forces to bring out a new special edition Super Duty. The Harley-Davidson package was available on both F-250 and F-350 Crew Cab SRW models. A gasoline engine was no longer offered with the package; instead, a 6.4 L Power Stroke turbo diesel was standard. Unique black and dusted copper two-tone leather captain's chairs with bar and shield logo, leather-trimmed center console, unique gauge cluster, and embroidered carpeted floor mats rounded out interior features. 20" wheels, billet-style grille, blacked out headlights, illuminated cab steps, power folding body-color Powerscope mirrors, rubber bed mat with Harley-Davidson logo and special badging were the exterior highlights. The truck could be ordered with two unique exterior themes, a black monochromatic look with bodyside graphics or a black and vintage copper two-tone with chrome dimensional box side Harley-Davidson lettering. An Audiophile premium 8-speaker stereo with subwoofer was standard, while a DVD-based navigation system was optional. Rear seat DVD entertainment system with 8" screen was also optional but could not be ordered with the power moonroof.

Also in 2008, a 60th anniversary package was available to celebrate 60 years of the F-Series brand, featuring two-tone paint, additional chrome trim, and special badging. 2,500 were to be built. It was only made in the XLT trim.

The Harley-Davidson package returned for 2009 with some changes. For the first time, the Harley-Davidson package was offered on the F-450 DRW pickup. The interior was trimmed in all black leather, instead of the two-tone for 2008. New colors were offered, Black with flame tape stripes, Black with Vista Blue painted flames or Dark Blue Pearl with Vista Blue painted flames. Ford's ToughBed spray on bedliner and a rearview camera were made options.

For 2010, only minor changes were made. Dark Blue Pearl was deleted from the color options in favor of Black with Tuxedo Black painted flames and the rearview camera was made standard. 2010 was the final year Ford offered a Harley edition Super Duty.

For 2009 and 2010, a special Cabela's edition was available in the Crew Cab FX4 configuration. This version included a basic package and a luxury package. The basic package includes cloth captain's chairs, wood trim on center stack, all-weather floor mats, front and rear locking firearm storage, and an AM/FM radio. The luxury package includes everything in the basic package but includes leather seats and a navigation-based radio. In addition, both versions feature special badging and two-tone paint options.

Powertrain
The same two gas engines are carried over and rated exactly the same from the 2nd generation. The 3-valve  V8 SOHC is standard. The 3-valve  V10 SOHC was still a $699 option over the 5.4L V8. The 4-valve Navistar  V8 OHV Power Stroke diesel engine was the diesel engine option and was a $6,895 option over the  V8.

F-450 pickup
There are some unique points to highlight of the 2008–2010 F-450 with a regular production pickup bed, which was only offered as a chassis cab before. It has 2 available axle ratios of 4.30 and 4.88:1. The maximum towing capacity is  (4.88 axle ratio) or  (4.30 axle ratio). The only engine offered in the F-450 is the 6.4 L V8 Power Stroke sequential turbo diesel. The F-450 is equipped with a standard 6-speed manual or optional 5-speed TorqShift automatic transmission.

Third generation (2011–2016) 

The Super Duty line received a significant exterior upgrade that includes a new, bigger front fascia. Its engines were also upgraded to better compete with the new Silverado HD and Ram HD. Ford stated in the 2011 Chicago Auto Show that the 2011 trucks have the thickest gauge steel frame of any truck in its class; this was due to the frame being the same design that debuted in 1999. The 2011 Ford F-Series Super Duty was awarded Truckin's "Topline Pulling Power" award for 2011. It also won Popular Mechanics best workhorse of 2011, and the best "Gear of the Year" in the trucks category.

Each engine is mated to a 6R140 heavy-duty TorqShift six-speed automatic transmission. The Ford F-250, F-350, and F-450 all come with trim levels including the XL, XLT, Lariat, King Ranch, and Platinum.

The 3rd generation of the Ford Super Duty trucks were assembled at Ford's Kentucky Truck Plant, with additional production for other countries in Venezuela and Mexico. In Venezuela, the F-350 was offered as a commercial use small truck cutaway featuring a 6.2L V8 gas engine with a 5-speed manual TREMEC transmission TR-4050 with a choice of 4x2 or 4x4 wheel drive. Since 2012 due to government regulations, the Venezuelan F-350 Super Duty is factory equipped to use both natural gas and gasoline. The F-250 Super Duty was also recently re-introduced in this market after ten years. It is being marketed using the same engine as the Venezuelan F-350, but only with a 6-speed automatic transmission, 4x2 or 4x4 wheel drive option in both single and double cab configurations.

A feature unique to the 2011 Super Duty is the addition of a locking differential. It is only available for the F-250 and SRW F-350 4x4 models with a rear Sterling 10.5 axle. It is a US$390 option. The diesel F-250 relies on vacuum-boost brakes, while the F-350 relies on Hydro-boost. Both gas versions of the F-250 and SRW F-350 use vacuum-boost. F-250 is a class 2 truck. While the F-350 SRW, F-350 DRW, & F-450 pickup are class 3. The F-250 and F-350 (SRW & DRW) have 13.66-inch front brakes and 13.39-inch inch rear brakes. The 2015-2016 F-250 and F-350 have 14.29-inch vented disc brakes on the front and rear axles as an improvement made for these model years. The F-450 pickup has 14.53-inch front brakes and 15.35-inch rear brakes. The F-450 has a wider track than the F-350. The F-450 remains available in class 4 as a chassis cab truck.

The trucks were once under investigation by the National Highway Traffic Safety Administration for steering failures, but the investigation revealed the failures were driver error and had nothing to do with design.

For the 2011 model year, the central bezel from the second-generation (2008-2010) Super Duty was kept, although features such as a full color LCD instrument panel display screen and a Sony premium amplified audio system with subwoofer were now available. An auxiliary audio input jack now came standard on all Super Duty models, regardless of radio choice.

In 2013, upper trim level Super Duties could be ordered with the new MyFord Touch infotainment system with Ford SYNC, which included an eight-inch touchscreen display, a rear backup camera system, and HD Radio. The center bezel in these trucks was slightly redesigned to accommodate the new infotainment system, which was also paired with the Sony premium amplified audio system with subwoofer.

Trim
XL - Included: Vinyl upholstery, manual seats with cupholders and storage bin in front, manual locks, manual windows, 17" steel wheels (F-250/350) or 17" aluminum wheels (F-450), trailer brake controller (DRW), manual air conditioning, black vinyl floor covering, malfunction message center, manual towing mirrors, and an AM/FM stereo with digital clock and 2 speakers. 
XLT - Added: 17" aluminum wheels, trailer brake controller, accessory delay, power locks, power windows with automatic driver's side window, cruise control, MyKey owner controls, security alarm, tinted rear windows, keyless entry, heated mirrors with turn signals, and an AM/FM stereo with single-CD player with MP3 capability, an auxiliary input jack and 4 speakers.
Lariat - Added: leather upholstery, flow through center console with lockable storage, a 120V power outlet, reverse parking aid, leather trimmed power front seats, air conditioning with auto temp control, auto-dimming rear view mirror, enhanced message center, a premium AM/FM stereo with single-CD player, MP3 capability, auxiliary input jack, SIRIUS Satellite Radio, steering wheel audio controls and 8 speakers with subwoofer, auto lamp with rain lamp feature, fog lamps, power sliding rear window, power heated mirrors with spotlights and turn signals, SecuriLock entry keypad, body colored handles, and Ford SYNC.
King Ranch - Added: chaparral-leather trimmed seats, heated and cooled front seats, chaparral leather-wrapped steering wheel with audio controls, memory driver's seat, pedals and mirrors, rear view camera, remote start, King Ranch logo on seats and floor, and body color mirrors.

Powertrain

Engines
The 2011 Ford Super Duty is available with either a gas or diesel engine. The new engine is an entirely Ford product, unlike previous diesels, therefore reducing development costs and shipping delays. The 6.8-liter V10 was dropped from the regular Super Duty models, however it is still an option with the F-450 and F-550 chassis cabs, mated with a 5-speed automatic transmission.

For customers who purchased a Super Duty with the original Power Stroke V8, Ford offered a free upgrade at dealerships to the new level of output.

Transmission
No manual transmission is available in the United States, but in Mexico and Venezuela, the F-350 is available with a 5-speed manual. Automatic transmission features a manual mode. The diesel engine's transmission optionally features a PTO and is a "live-drive" unit. "Live-drive" meaning the PTO is directly connected to the engine's crankshaft, whereas the GM's Allison 1000 transmission and Ram's Aisin use a torque converter or clutch (depending on being an automatic or manual, respectively).

Cooling system
On the 6.7 L diesel engine only, there are 2 separate cooling systems:
Low-temperature system with a  coolant for the following:
fuel cooler
EGR system
transmission fluid
air-to-water inter-cooler
A belt-driven pump mounted low on the driver side circulates the high-temperature coolant, while a separate belt-driven pump mounted higher on the passenger side circulates the low-temperature coolant.

F-450 pickup

Just like the 2008-2010 model, the F-450 pickup is only available in one single configuration; a crew cab with a dual rear-wheel  bed. The only powertrain combination is the 6.7 L Powerstroke turbodiesel V8 mated to the six-speed TorqShift automatic transmission (model year 2020 and greater trucks are mated with the ten-speed TorqShift automatic transmission). Trims include the XL, XLT, Lariat, King Ranch, and Platinum.

Wheelbase:  (Crew cab, long bed)
Payload:  (2011),  (2012),  (2013),  (2015)
 Towing capacity:  (2011),  (2012),  (2013),  (2015)
Front GAWR: 
Rear GAWR: 
GVWR:  (2011),  (2012),  (2013),  (2015)
GCWR: ,  (2015)
Axle gear ratio: 4.30:1
4x4 only. No two-wheel drive unlike the 2008-2010 (until 2018).
Alcoa forged wheels are the only available wheels.
 LT245/75R17 (2011-2014)
 MT225/70R19.5 (2015-2016)

Chassis cab

Chassis cab models were also updated using the new 2011 body style. Ford chassis cabs were still rated up to the industry maximum 19,500-pound Gross Vehicle Weight Rating.

Fourth generation (2017–2022) 

On September 24, 2015, Ford unveiled the 2017 Ford Super Duty line at the 2015 State Fair of Texas. This marks the first all-new Super Duty line since their 1998 debut; the frame is made from 95% high strength steel and the body (like the contemporary F-150) is made from 6000 series aluminum alloy, advertised as a high-strength military grade aluminum alloy.

For the first time since 1999, both the Super Duty and F-150 lines are constructed using the same cab to better compete with GM, Ram and Nissan's HD trucks. In a major departure, the stand-alone front grille and stepped front fenders seen since 1998 were eliminated from the exterior. The 2-bar grille introduced in 2011 was widened, integrating the headlights into its design.

In a switch to an aluminum-intensive body similar to the F-150, Ford created a potential  of weight savings; in spite of the addition of heavier-duty frame and driveline components, the 2017 Super Duty weighs in at up to  less than comparable 2016 models. Ford strengthened the frame and drivetrain with fortified drive shafts, axles, brakes, towing hardware and the 4WD transfer case. F-250 and F-350 pickups are built on a fully boxed frame; chassis cab models are produced on a frame boxed up to the rear of the cab and of open-C-channel design rearward.

For 2017 production, the Super Duty line shares its powertrain lineup with its 2016 predecessor: a 6.2L gasoline V8, 6.8L V10 (F-450 and above), with a 6.7L diesel V8 available in all versions. Additionally, the gasoline V8 produces its max torque at over 700 rpm less than the previous  engine. The diesel engine now produces its peak torque at 1,800 rpm instead of the previous 1,600 rpm. The F-250 receives a TorqShift-G six-speed automatic while all other Super Duty trucks are paired with the 6R140 6-speed automatic. Crew Cab models will have a  tank for the  bed and  fuel tank for the  bed.

The interior design of the all-new Super Duty is similar to that of the 2015 Ford F-150, and shares many of the F-150's components.

Trim levels will continue to be XL, XLT, Lariat, King Ranch, and Platinum. The Limited trim would not debut for F-250 and F-350 until 2018. Cab configurations continue to be 2-Door Regular Cab, 4-Door Super Cab, and 4-Door Crew Cab (the F-450, in pickup truck configuration, is only available in this configuration until the 2019 model year with the addition of the regular cab), with Short Box (6' 9") and Long Box (8') bed lengths. The truck will be available in F-250, F-350, and F-450 pickup truck models, and F-350, F-450, and F-550 chassis cab models. All will be available in both 4X2 and 4X4 configurations. The F-350 will be the only model available in either Single Rear Wheel (SRW) or Dual Rear Wheel (DRW) configurations, the F-450 and F-550 will only be available in a Dual Rear Wheel (DRW) configuration, and the F-250 will only be available in a Single Rear Wheel configuration. Base prices in the U.S. range from $32,535 (F-250 XL) to $77,125 (F-450 Platinum). Full pricing is available on the manufacturer's website.

The 2018 F-450 was the first $100,000 pickup truck from the factory, with the addition of the new Limited trim, which first debuted on the 2013 Ford F-150.

Engines

All engines will be paired with a "TorqShift" 6-speed automatic transmission, with the gasoline engines featuring 2 transmissions: 5-speed manual transmission (chassis cab F-350, Mexico-only), Ford's all-new "TorqShift-G" automatic transmission.

The Super Duty will be available in eleven exterior color options.

Safety recalls
On April 4, 2017, all Ford F-250 Super Duty trucks built between October 1, 2015, to April 1, 2017, were recalled due to the risk of improper and damaged rods in the parking brake and transmission allowing the truck to move while in park. This affected 52,000 trucks but no injuries or accidents were reported.

2020 refresh 

The 2020 Super Duty debuted at the 2019 Chicago Auto Show in February. It features a revised grille and tailgate design, new wheel options, and higher-quality interior materials for the Limited trim. A new 7.3-liter gasoline engine is available. Nicknamed "Godzilla", it makes 430 horsepower and 475 lb-ft of torque. Ford's 10-speed 10R140 TorqShift automatic transmission is now standard with the diesel and 7.3-liter gasoline engines on the F-250 and all engines on the F-350; the 6-speed is still available, but only in the F-250 with the 6.2-liter engine.

2022 hydrogen fuel cell prototype 
A F-550 Super Duty hydrogen fuel cell electric truck is being prototyped in cooperation with Southern California Gas Co., as part of the US Department of Energy's (DOE) SuperTruck 3 program.

F-600 
For 2020, Ford reintroduced the F-600, a name that was last used in the late 1990s on a medium-duty truck. Based on the F-550 Super Duty, the F-600 medium-duty features the body and cab of a traditional Super Duty chassis cab but upgrades the chassis over and above the F-550 and offers no cab configurations besides single cab. The cab-to-axle options are retained. The F-600 chassis upgrades include upsized U-joints, an alteration to the diesel exhaust system to accommodate dynamic clearances for the larger U-joint crosses, upgraded brakes, and wider wheels (19x6.75" instead of 19x6") to support wider tires (245mm instead of 225mm) for increased tire load capacity. The model is geared towards fleet buyers who require the GVWR capacity of the heavier F-650 medium-duty but prefer the size and maneuverability of the smaller F-550 Super Duty. Available with either the 7.3L Ford Godzilla engine gasoline V8 or the 6.7L Powerstroke Turbodiesel V8 engine and paired with the TorqShift 10-speed automatic transmission and two-wheel-drive (4X2) or four-wheel-drive (4X4), the F-600 Medium Duty went on sale in mid-2020.

Front brakes: 
Rear brakes:  
Mid Fuel tank capacity: 
Rear tank: 
GCWR: 
GVWR: 
Payload: 
Hitch: 
Front sway bar:  {5160 steel}
Rear sway bar:  {5160 steel}

Tremor 

For 2020, Ford reintroduced the "Tremor" name for the F-250 and F-350 Super Duty pickups. The nameplate was last used on the 2014 Ford F-150 as a sport appearance package. As an off-road oriented version of the F-250 and F-350 Super Duty, the Tremor models will compete directly with the Ram 2500 Power Wagon and feature a suspension lift and upgraded tires and wheels from the factory. The trucks also offer details not found on other Super Duty models, such as available blacked out accents on the front grille, wheels, side emblems, and side mirrors as well as 'Tremor' decals on the sides of the pickup box. Offered as a Crew Cab model with a 6-3/4-foot pickup box, and with four-wheel-drive (4X4), the Tremor comes with the new 7.3L "Godzilla" gasoline V8 engine as standard, while the 6.7L Powerstroke Turbo Diesel V8 engine will be optional (the Ram 2500 Power Wagon only offers a gasoline V8 engine).

Off-road upgrades include 35-inch Goodyear Wrangler Duratrac maximum-traction tires, a specially tuned rear stabilizer bar, custom 1.7-inch piston twin-tube dampers, a Dana limited-slip front differential, Electronic Locking Rear Differential, off-road running boards, large skid plates, and extended-axle vent tubes. Also, the Super Duty Tremor Off-Road Package has the highest approach angle (31.65 degrees) and departure angle (24.51 degrees) of any Super Duty model ever built.

The new 10-speed "TorqShift" automatic transmission features Selectable Drive Modes with settings for Deep Snow/Sand, Slippery, Eco, Tow/Haul, and Normal, as well as an exclusive Rock-Crawl mode. The Super Duty Tremor Off-Road Package also has a Trail Control feature, which is essentially cruise control for off-road driving. Crawl ratios are 53:1 for gasoline-equipped models, while the ratio for diesel-equipped models is 44:1. Another available feature for all Super Duty models (including the Tremor), is the Trailer Reverse Guidance System, which is similar to the Pro Trailer Backup Assist system in the Ford F-150 and allows for the driver to easily back their truck and trailer with little effort. The all-new 2020 Ford F-250 and F-350 Super Duty Tremor models went on sale in the Fall of 2019.

Fifth generation (2023)

The fifth generation Super Duty was revealed in September 2022. It is set to start production in early 2023.

Marketing 
As of 2016, the Ford Super Duty is sold in the United States, Canada, Mexico, Venezuela (F-250 and F-350), Suriname, Brazil (F-350/F-4000), Argentina (F-4000 only), Angola (F-250 and F-350), Cambodia, the Middle East, and Iceland (F-350 only) in left-hand drive (LHD) only.

In Suriname, though traffic is on the left side of the road, the import and registry of LHD vehicles is allowed.

In Australia, it was officially imported in right-hand drive from Brazil from 2001 to 2006, but as of 2007, Ford no longer offers the Super Duty in Australia.

Variants

Medium-duty trucks (F-650 and F-750)

In 2000, Ford returned to the Class 6-7 truck market as it expanded the Super Duty line into the medium-duty segment. They developed a joint venture with Navistar International known as Blue Diamond Trucks, the F-650 and F-750 Super Duty were assembled in Mexico. While the chassis and other components would be common to both manufacturers, Ford and International would each source their own bodywork and powertrain; the cab for the Ford trucks would be common with other Super Duty models.

For the 2016 model year, the medium-duty truck range was given a major upgrade, following the end of the joint venture and the shift of the production to the United States. In place of outsourced engines and transmissions, the 2016 F-650 and F-750 now use a 6.8L gasoline V10, a 6.7L PowerStroke diesel V8, and a 6-speed automatic transmission all supplied by Ford.

Sport-utility vehicles

From 2000 to 2005, the F-250 Super Duty served as a basis for the Ford Excursion sport-utility vehicle. Along with Chevrolet Suburban (and its Cadillac/GMC/Holden counterparts) and the International Harvester Travelall, the Ford Excursion was one of the longest non-limousine sport-utility vehicles ever sold.

The Excursion was available in three trim packages, XLT, Limited, and top-of-the-line Eddie Bauer. It was offered in two or four wheel drive, and with three engine options: the 5.4L V8, the 6.8L V10, or the Powerstroke V8 Turbodiesel. The Excursion was only available with an automatic transmission.

While the Excursion was sold mostly in North America and Mexico, a similar vehicle was sold in Brazil from 1998 to 2012 as a second-party conversion of the Ford F-250 crew-cab (similar to the Centurion F-Series/Bronco conversions).

Armored vehicles

 
As a result of the heavy-duty frame and powertrain of its chassis, the Ford Super Duty has served as a donor platform for multiple types of armored vehicles, for civilian, law enforcement, and military use. Most versions are constructed using the Ford F-550 chassis cab. Examples include the STREIT/KrAZ Spartan, Didgori-2, Lenco BearCat, Plasan Sand Cat, Roshel Senator, GAV Gurkha, APC Novator, Conquest Knight XV, and TAD Turangga.

See also
Ford F-Series - Overview of Ford full-size truck range
Ford F-series (medium duty) - medium-duty (Class 6–8) commercial trucks
Ford F-150 - standard-duty F-Series (current generation)
Ford P platform - Ford full-size pickup truck chassis architecture
Ford Excursion - SUV variant of F-250 Super Duty
Ford Super Duty engine - V8 truck engines (1958-1981)

References

External links

 
Ford F-4000 official site (Brazil)
Ford Super Duty Dimensions (2008–2010)

Super Duty
Pickup trucks
Vehicles introduced in 1998
Motor vehicles manufactured in the United States
Rear-wheel-drive vehicles
All-wheel-drive vehicles
2000s cars
2010s cars
Class 3 trucks
Class 4 trucks
Class 5 trucks